The International Secretariat of Entertainment Trade Unions (ISETU) was a global union federation bringing together trade unions representing workers in the arts, media and entertainment industries.

History
The secretariat was established in 1965, on the initiative of the International Confederation of Free Trade Unions.  It absorbed the International Congress of Broadcasting Unions, and adopted two existing bodies, the European Union of Film and Television Workers, and the Inter-American Federation of Entertainment Workers, as regional bodies.

The first general secretary, Alan Forrest, believed that the funding for the new organisation came from the American government, and was intended to provide a less radical alternative to the International Federation of Actors (FIA) and International Federation of Musicians (FIM).  These allegations were never proven, but influenced the perception of the organisation among many trade unionists, and it did not attract affiliations from any unions which held membership of the FIA or FIM.

ISETU was initially based in Brussels, but later moved its headquarters to London, and then on to Vienna, and finally Geneva.  In 1984, it affiliated to the International Federation of Commercial, Clerical, Professional and Technical Employees (FIET) and became known as the International Secretariat for Arts, Mass Media and Entertainment Trade Unions (ISETU-FIET), but retained a high level of autonomy.

At the start of 1992, the federation left FIET, and instead established the International Committee of Entertainment and Media Unions with the FIA, FIM, International Federation of Audio Visual Workers (FISTAV) and the International Federation of Journalists, the International Graphical Federation soon also joining.  Relationships with FISTAV were particularly strong, and in 1993, the two secretariats merged, forming what became known as the Media and Entertainment International.

Affiliates
In 1979, the following unions were affiliated to the federation:

Leadership

General Secretaries
1965: Alan Forrest
1972: Post vacant
1984: Irene Robadey
1991: Jim Wilson

Presidents
1965: Leslie Littlewood
1971: Robin Richardson
1976: Josef Schweinzer
1984: Walter Bacher

References

Trade unions established in 1965
Trade unions disestablished in 1993
Global union federations
Entertainment industry unions